Jeroen Masson (born 2 January 1981) is a Belgian former professional tennis player.

Although born in Belgium, Masson was raised in South Africa and comes from a family of bakers. In order to embark on a career in professional tennis he returned to his birth country at the age of 18 and became a Belgian national. He reached a best singles world ranking of 215, had a win over Novak Djokovic (in 2004), won 13 ITF Futures titles and was runner-up at the 2005 Belgrade Challenger. In 2009 he announced his retirement from the tour.

ATP Challenger/ITF Futures finals

Singles: 25 (13–12)

References

External links
 
 

1981 births
Living people
Belgian male tennis players
Sportspeople from Ghent
South African people of Belgian descent